Frank Tsamoutales (born May 1, 1960) is a government and business consultant and a Florida native. He is the President, Chairman, and CEO of Tsamoutales Strategies.

Education
Tsamoutales graduated from Melbourne Central Catholic High School in 1978, and earned a BS from Florida State University in 1982, concentrating in Government and Communications. In addition, Tsamoutales completed leadership training at the Covey Leadership Center.

Family
Tsamoutales married Kimberly Hill, daughter of former Orlando Magic Coach Brian Hill. They reside in Vero Beach as well as Jackson Hole, Wyoming.

Tsamoutales' wife suffers from cystic fibrosis and is active in supporting related causes and foundations.

Career
Tsamoutales was a campus coordinator for George Bush's 1980 campaign at Florida State University in Tallahassee.  Tsamoutales was a Co-Chairman of the National Finance Committee for presidential campaigns for Ronald Reagan then-Vice President George H. W. Bush, and most recently for Governor Mike Huckabee's campaign for President of the United States in 2008. He also held leadership positions on the finance committee for all three of the Jeb Bush for Florida Governor campaigns, Bob Martinez for Florida Governor Campaign, Tom Gallahager for Florida Governor Campaign, Marco Rubio for US Senate, Bill Posey for US Congress and Daniel Webster for US Congress campaigns, as well as the Mike Haridopolos for the Florida House and Florida Senate campaigns, just to name a few.

Tsamoutales served on the RTCA special committee responsible for the establishment of aviation-related security standards. Appointed by two Governors, he served on the East Central Florida Regional Planning Council, the Technological Research and Development Authority and the former Florida Department of Commerce Economic Development Commission. He was also named one of the 100 most powerful people on the nations space coast.

Tsamoutales served as Chairman of HuckPac, a national political action committee chaired by TV host and best selling author Governor Mike Huckabee.

Tsamoutales was the only non-Polish Advisor to Nobel Prize Laureate Lech Walesa's successful campaign for President of Poland.

He has led delegations of business leaders to assist entrepreneurs in Poland to develop a free economy. He has also represented major US corporations and negotiated on their behalf privatization agreements in the aviation, transportation, and maritime industries in Poland, then-East Germany, the Netherlands, and Hungary.

In the domestic arena, Tsamoutales consults and is registered to represent such firms as ABM Industries, BJ's Wholesale Club, Honeywell International, Inc., Kamylon Holdings, KTA-Tator, Inc., SitelogIQ, Inc., Tensor Engineering and Transformative Healthcare before federal, state and local government as well as leading business development.

Tsamoutales Strategies
Tsamoutales Strategies is a business, management and government consulting firm owned and operated by Frank Tsamoutales (who acts as Founder, Chairman, and CEO).

Tsamoutales Strategies once employed Sarah Huckabee Sanders (a Donald Trump Presidential Administration White House Press Secretary) as a Vice President.

References

Businesspeople from Florida
Living people
1960 births
People from Indialantic, Florida
People from Tallahassee, Florida
American people of Greek descent
Greek Orthodox Christians from the United States